The House of Franckenstein (also Frankenstein) is the name of a feudal, Franconian noble family in Germany, descendants from the Dynasts of the  Breuberg family; offsprings of the Lords of Lützelbach from Höchst im Odenwald.

Family legend 
In 948 an Arbogast von Franckenstein confirmed to the abbot of Lorsch Abbey in two contracts to "grant defense and shield the carriages travelling on the Bergstraße and passing through Frankenstein realm". In the same year, this knight Arbogast is supposed to have won the Tournament of Cologne, thanks to an invitation of the Archbishop Bruno the Great, who was said to have been the former abbot of Lorsch Abbey.

Arbogast von Franckenstein is mentioned in Georg Rüxners Turnierbuch, a tournament book, but is probably legendary as Rüxners's statements, especially when citing "earlier centuries", are often deemed. 
One has to add, that the contracts are not to be found in the Lorsch Abbey archives, but are appearing in secondary literature.
As a matter of fact, it is certified that the Franckenstein clan is directly originating from Lord Konrad II. Reiz von Breuberg and therefore starting to exist in the 13th century.

History 
Ludovic of Luetzelbach was the first ancestor of the Frankenstein dynasty and is documented in the year 1115 for the first time.
His grandson Konrad I. and his offspring built the homonymous Breuberg Castle around 1200 and named themselves after it. In 1239, owing to his son's Eberhard I. Reiz von Breuberg marriage with Mechtild (Elisabeth?), one of the five heiresses of Gerlach II. von Büdingen, imperial bailiff of the Wetteraukreis, the power, possessions and interests were also relocated into the Wetterau region, where the Breubergians Arrois, Gerlach and Eberhard III. held the bailiffship consecutively. They found their last resting-place in the monastery of Konradsdorf, where the family had made many donations.
Before 1250, Lord Konrad II. Reiz von Breuberg erected Frankenstein Castle near Darmstadt and since named himself "von und zu Frankenstein". He was the founder of the free imperial lordship Frankenstein, which was subject only to the jurisdiction of the emperor, with possessions in Nieder-Beerbach, Darmstadt, Ockstadt, Wetterau and Hesse. Additionally the Frankensteins held other possession and Sovereignty-rights as Burgraves in Zwingenberg (Auerbach (Bensheim), in Darmstadt, Groß-Gerau, Frankfurt am Main and Bensheim. 

In the year 1292 the Frankensteins opened the castle to the counts of Katzenelnbogen (County of Katzenelnbogen) and leagued with them.
Being both strong opponents of the Protestant Reformation and following territorial conflicts, connected disputes with the Landgraviate of Hesse-Darmstadt, as well as the adherence to the catholic faith and the associated "right of patronage", the family head Lord Johannes I. decided to sell the lordship to the landgrave in 1662, after various lawsuits at the Imperial Chamber Court.

Because of many vacancies in relation with the reformation, some family members could fill a number of unengaged offices and posts in various Chapters, Abbeys and Dioceses as Canons, Abbesses and Prince-Bishops.
After the sale of Frankenstein and being awarded the imperial baron dignity in 1670, the family retired to its possessions in Wetterau and acquired the lordship of Ullstadt in the beginning of the 17th century in Middle Franconia. In the 19th century they also bought the Lordship of Thalheim bei Wels in Austria. The family still consists of two existing branches in Germany, Austria and the US.

Prominent family members 
Konrad II Reiz von Breuberg, also Konrad I von Frankenstein, first bearer of the family name (1245–1292)
Apetzko (Apeczko - Arbogast) von Frankenstein, Bishop of Lebus (1345–1352)
Rudolf von und zu Frankenstein, Prince-Bishop of Speyer (1552–1560)
Johann Karl von und zu Franckenstein, Prince-Bishop of Worms (1683–1691)
Johann Philipp Anton von Franckenstein, Prince-Bishop of Bamberg (1746–1753)
Johann Karl Friedrich Franz Xaver Freiherr von Frankenstein auf Ockstatt, Holstatt und Erpen was Minister Plenipotentiary of the Grand Duchy of Frankfurt at the Royal Bavarian Court
Georg von und zu Franckenstein, RVO, K.u.K. Special Envoy to the Osman Imperial Court, Austrian Ambassador in London from 1920–1938
Clement von Franckenstein (1944–2019) son of Georg, English/American film actor 
Clemens von und zu Franckenstein (1875–1942), German composer and last general director of the Royal Bavarian Opera and Theatres
Georg Arbogast, Reichsfreiherr von und zu Franckenstein, German member of Parliament, Vice President of Zentrumspartei, President of the Bavarian House of Lords (1825–1890)
Joseph Freiherr von Franckenstein, Austro-German fighter against the Nazi regime, editor-in-chief of Die Neue Zeitung
 Kay Baroness Franckenstein, née Kay Boyle, US writer and political activist

Picture gallery

Family tree
Karl Arbogast Viscount Franckenstein (1798-1845)  ∞ Leopoldine Countess Apponyi de Nagy-Appony (1804-1870) 
Georg Arbogast, Viscount Franckenstein  ∞ Maria Theresia Princess Oettingen-Wallerstein 
Johann Karl Viscount Franckenstein (1858-1913) 
Moritz Viscount Franckenstein (1869-1931)  ∞ Maria Pia Countess Stolberg-Stolberg (1870–1913)
Anna Maria (1896-1998)
Georg Viscount Franckenstein (1898-1965)  ∞ Karoline, Princess Schönburg-Hartenstein (* 23. Dezember 1898; † 27. April 1985)
Marie Leopoldine (1901-1970)
Heinrich (1902-1991) ∞ 1953 Theresa Maria Josefa Riccabona von Reichenfels (* 10. April 1909)
Marie Elisabeth (1905-1919)
Karl Viscount Franckenstein (1831-1898)  ∞ Elma Countess Schönborn-Wiesentheid
Leopoldine Baroness Franckenstein (1874–1918)
Clemens Baron Franckenstein (1875–1942)  ∞ Maria Nezádal
Georg Baron Franckenstein  (1878–1953) ∞ Editha King (1916-1953)
Clement Baron Franckenstein (1944-2019)
Heinrich Viscount Franckenstein (1826-1883)  ∞ Helene Countess Arco-Zinneberg (1837-1897)  
Konrad Viscount Franckenstein (1875-1938)  ∞ Anna Maria Countess Esterházy-Galantha (1886-1968)  
Heinrich Maria Viscount Franckenstein (1908-1982)  ∞ Maria Pia Baroness Fürstenberg , Countess Deroy (1905-1961) 
Joseph Viscount Franckenstein  (1910-1963) ∞ Kay Boyle (1902-1992)
Ludwig Maria von und zu Franckenstein (1914-1945)  ∞ Dorothea von Kobbe (1921-1954)

Coat of arms 
Divided and split two times coated with a golden heartshield, therein an oblique red battle axe on Gold.

Building work by the Frankenstein family

Literature 

 Karl O. von Aretin: Franckenstein Eine politische Karriere zwischen Bismarck und Ludwig II.. Klett-Cotta, Stuttgart 2003, .
 J. Friedrich Battenberg: Roßdorf in vormoderner Zeit. Alltag und Konfliktkultur einer hessischen Landgemeinde im 17. und 18. Jahrhundert. In: Archiv für hessische Geschichte und Altertumskunde, Bd. N.F. 60 (2002), S. 29–60
 Roman Fischer: Findbuch zum Bestand Frankensteinische Lehenurkunden 1251–1812.  Kramer, Frankfurt am Main 1992, 
 Georg von Franckenstein: Zwischen Wien und London Erinnerungen eines österreichischen Diplomaten. Leopold Stocker Verlag, Graz 2005, .
 Sir George Franckenstein, Facts and features of my life, .
 Genealogisches Handbuch des Adels Band 27; Freiherrliche Häuser A IV, CA Starke Verlag.
 Genealogisches Handbuch des Adels, Band 61, 1975, Adelslexikon. Starke, Limburg/Lahn
 Walter Scheele: Sagenhafter Franckenstein. Societäts-Verlag, Ulm 2004, 
 Otto von Waldenfels (Hrsg.): Genealogisches Handbuch des in Bayern immatrikulierten Adels.  Verlag Degener, Neustadt an der Aisch.
 Hellmuth Gensicke: Untersuchungen zur Genealogie und Besitzgeschichte der Herren von Eschollbrücken, Weiterstadt, Lützelbach, Breuberg und Frankenstein.  In: Hessische historische Forschungen (1963), S.99–115
 Walter Scheele: Burg Franckenstein. Societäts-Verlag, Frankfurt/Main 2001, 
 Historischer Verein für Hessen, Archiv für hessische Geschichte und Altertumskunde.
 Otto Hupp: Münchener Kalender 1912. Verlagsanstalt München / Regensburg 1912.
 Rudolf Kunz: Dorfordnungen der Herrschaft Franckenstein aus der 2. Hälfte des 16. Jahrhunderts. Sonderdruck aus: Archiv für hessische Geschichte und Altertumskunde. Band 26, Heft 1, 1958
 Wolfgang Weißgerber: Die Herren von Frankenstein und ihre Frauen: Landschaften, Personen, Geschichten. Schlapp, Darmstadt-Eberstadt 2002, .
 
 Norbert Hierl-Deronco: "Es ist eine Lust zu Bauen". Von Bauherren, Bauleuten und vom Bauen im Barock in Kurbayern, Franken, Rheinland. Krailling 2001, S. 133–142

See also
 Lordship of Franckenstein

References

External links 
 Frankenstein Crest in the Ortenburger Wappenbuch from 1466
 Frankenstein Armorial Bearings in Johann Siebmachers Wappenbuch
 Frankenstein coat of arms in www.geocities.com
 Crest in Ingeram-Codex
 Geschichte der Familie Frankenstein in www.muehltal-odenwald.de
 www.eberstadt-frankenstein.de
 EBIDAT - Burgendatenbank des Europäischen Burgeninstitutes
 Die Geschichte der Wappen der von Franckenstein
 Haus der Bayerischen Geschichte, Burgen in Bayern

Franckenstein
Medieval nobility of the Holy Roman Empire
Franckenstein, House of
Franckenstein, House of
Germany
Noble houses
European noble families
Noble families of the Holy Roman Empire
Bavarian noble families